The 2019 Associate international cricket season was from May to August 2019. All official twenty over matches between Associate members of the ICC were eligible to have full Twenty20 International (T20I) or Women's Twenty20 International (WT20I) status, as the International Cricket Council (ICC) granted T20I status to matches between all of its members from 1 July 2018 (women's teams) and 1 January 2019 (men's teams). The season included all T20I/WT20I cricket series mostly involving ICC Associate members, that were played in addition to series covered in International cricket in 2019. More than 75% of men's T20I matches in the 2019 calendar year featured Associate teams.

Season overview

May

Germany in Belgium

Germany against Italy in the Netherlands

Jersey women in Guernsey

Jersey in Guernsey

June

2019 Kwibuka Women's T20 Tournament

2019 Malaysia Tri-Nation Series

July

Kuwait in Qatar

2019 Pacific Games – Men's event

2019 Pacific Games – Women's event

Nepal in Malaysia

Finland in Denmark

2019 France Women's T20I Quadrangular Series

August

Spain in Finland

Botswana in Namibia

Bangladesh women against Thailand women in the Netherlands

Bangladesh women in the Netherlands

Malaysia women in Singapore

2019 Continental Cup

(H) Host, (Q) Qualified

See also
 International cricket in 2019

References

2019 in cricket